The Haltemprice by-election was held on 11 February 1954. It was held due to the elevation to a hereditary peerage of the incumbent Conservative MP, Richard Kidston Law.  The by-election was won by the Conservative candidate, Patrick Wall.

References

By-elections to the Parliament of the United Kingdom in Yorkshire and the Humber constituencies
1954 elections in the United Kingdom
1954 in England
1950s in the East Riding of Yorkshire